Patrick Küng (born 11 January 1984) is a Swiss former World Cup alpine ski racer. He specialised in the speed events of Downhill and  Super G and made his World Cup debut at Wengen in 2009.

Küng represented Switzerland at the World Championships in 2013 in Schladming, Austria. After placing 18th in the Super G, he produced his best run of the 2013 season in the downhill, finishing in 7th position.

Küng's first World Cup win came in Super G in December 2013, at Beaver Creek, USA. His second came a month later at the downhill in Wengen, Switzerland. Through January 2015, he has two World Cup wins and five podiums.

Küng won the gold medal in downhill at the 2015 World Championships at Beaver Creek.

At the Kitzbühel World Cup meeting in January 2019, Küng announced his immediate retirement from competition, citing a lack of willingness to take the necessary risks following a crash in Wengen which left him concussed.

World Cup results

Season standings

Standings through 28 January 2018

Race podiums
 2 wins – (1 DH, 1 SG)
 5 podiums – (3 DH, 2 SG)

World Championships results

Olympic results

References

External links

Patrick Küng World Cup standings at the International Ski Federation

Swiss Ski team – official site 
Salomon Racing.com – team – alpine skiing – Patrick Küng
 
Sochi 2014 – Patrick Kueng

Swiss male alpine skiers
1984 births
Living people
Alpine skiers at the 2014 Winter Olympics
Olympic alpine skiers of Switzerland
People from Glarus
21st-century Swiss people